Act Your Age is the fourth album by Gordon Goodwin's Big Phat Band.  It received a Grammy Award nomination in 2008 for Best Large Jazz Ensemble Album. Gordon Goodwin received nominations for Best Instrumental Composition ("Hit the Ground Running") and Best Instrumental Arrangement ("Yesterdays").

Guests include Chick Corea performing his own composition, "Señor Mouse". Another track incorporates Zenph Studios' re-performance of Art Tatum's 1949 recording of "Yesterdays" with a big band arrangement by Goodwin.

The album includes a DVD containing recording studio footage and bonus features, such as a 5.1 surround sound mix of the album.

Track listing

Source: AllMusic

Personnel

Band

 Gordon Goodwin – piano, soprano saxophone, tenor saxophone
 Jeff Driskill – clarinet, flute, tenor saxophone
 Sal Lozano – flute, piccolo, alto saxophone
 Eric Marienthal – flute, alto saxophone, soprano saxophone
 Jay Mason – bass, bass clarinet, baritone saxophone
 Brian Scanlon – clarinet, flute, tenor saxophone
 Wayne Bergeron – trumpet
 Daniel Fornero – trumpet
 Dan Savant – trumpet
 Alex Iles – trombone
 Andy Martin – trombone
 Charlie Morillas – trombone
 Francisco Torres – trombone
 Craig Ware – bass trombone
 Grant Geissman – guitar
 Andrew Synowiec – guitar
 Bernie Dresel – drums
 Brad Dutz – percussion, vibraphone

Guests

 Chick Corea – piano 
 Dave Grusin – piano
 Art Tatum – piano 
 Lee Ritenour – guitar
 Nathan East – bass guitar
 Patti Austin – vocals

Technical

 David Helfant – executive producer
 John Trickett – executive producer
 David Tedds –producer
 Lee Ritenour – producer
 Gordon Goodwin – producer
 Dan Savant – producer
 Gary Lee – engineer
 Gus Skinas – engineer
 Bernie Kirsch – engineer
 Paul Klingberg – engineer, producer mixing, surround mix
 Tommy Vicari – engineer, mixing
 Richard King – engineer
 Michael Aarvold – digital editing, engineer
 Michael Atwell – digital editing
 Doug Sax – mastering

References 

2008 albums
Gordon Goodwin's Big Phat Band albums